The Oath of Stephan Huller may refer to:

 The Oath of Stephan Huller (novel), 1912 novel by Felix Hollaender
 The Oath of Stephan Huller (1912 film), German film based on the novel
 The Oath of Stephan Huller (1921 film), German film based on the novel